Kristof Konrad (born Krzysztof Wojslaw, April 26, 1962) is a Polish-American film, television, theatre, and voice actor, acting coach, voice coach, movement specialist and the Alexander Technique teacher. For over twenty years, he has successfully worked in film and television in both the United States and Europe, working with directors such as Kenneth Branagh, Francis Lawrence, Ron Howard, and Roland Emmerich and working opposite actors such as Jennifer Lawrence, Robin Wright, Kerry Washington, Jennifer Garner, and many more. He currently resides in Los Angeles and works internationally.

Early life
Kristof Konrad (birth name Krzysztof Wojsław) was born on April 26, 1962, in Gizycko, Poland. His father, Mieczyslaw, was a working-class man, and his mother, Jadwiga, a school teacher. He studied to become an electrical engineer, but at the age of 23, he decided to pursue a career in acting. For the next two years (1985-1987), Konrad attended the Alexander Zelwerowicz National Dramatic Academy in Warsaw, Poland. While there, he studied and worked with theatre and film masters Jerzy Grotowski and Andrzej Wajda. Upon graduating, he moved to Rome, Italy, where he studied with Alessandro Fersen at The Fersen Studio until 1992.

Career

Acting
After studying and working in Europe for seven years, Konrad moved to Hollywood in 1992. For over twenty years, he has successfully worked in film and television in the United States and Europe. He began his film career with a role in Independence Day directed by Roland Emmerich, followed by roles in Hotel California, Angels & Demons, Chernobyl Diaries, and many more. Some of his television credits include: Scorpion, Zoo, Agents of S.H.I.E.L.D., House of Cards, Scandal, Nikita, Alias, and many more.

Konrad appeared as Dimitri Ustinov, opposite Jennifer Lawrence, in the spy thriller Red Sparrow (2018), directed by Francis Lawrence and based on Jason Matthews' book of the same name. It follows Dominika Egorova (Lawrence), a Russian intelligence rookie who is assigned to seduce a CIA officer; she later falls in love with the officer and considers being a double agent.

Konrad will play Igor Zavarov in the upcoming Il ragazzo invisibile - Seconda generazione.

Movement specialist and acting coach 
Early in his career, Konrad discovered the Alexander Technique while working in the U.S. He was fascinated by its "effectiveness in improving the level of acting and helping one cope with the stresses of performing and everyday life." He spent three years training as an Alexander Technique teacher with Jean-Louis Rodrigue and many others at Alexander Training Institute of Los Angeles, where he also received his certification.

Konrad has taught for the Berlin International Film Festival, Verbier Festival & Academy in Switzerland, and the UBS Verbier Junior Orchestra. He teaches Acting in Film and Alexander Technique Intensive Workshops in New York, Los Angeles, Milan, Berlin, Toronto, and Vancouver. He collaborates with Jean-Louis Rodrigue at the Larry Moss Studio, Howard Fine Acting Studio, UCLA Extension Entertainment Studies, Theatricum Botanicum, and Media Access.

Konrad worked with the cast of King Lear and The Seagull of The Royal Shakespeare Company; helped Sharon Lawrence to create Vivien Leigh in Orson's Shadow at the Pasadena Playhouse; worked with the cast of Elecricidad at the Mark Taper Forum, and worked with the artists of Cirque du Soleil’s Ka on improving performance and preventing injuries.

Konrad coached Lymari Nadal in embodying Eva, the love interest of Denzel Washington in American Gangster.

Filmography (selection)

Film

Television
  Lois & Clark: The New Adventures of Superman (one episode, 1995) - Chip Off The Old Clark as Rebel Leader
  High Incident (one episode, 1996) - Christmas Blues as Kronsky
  JAG (one episode, 1997) -  Cowboys & Cossacks as Russian Communications Officer
  Beverly Hills, 90210 (one episode, 1998) - The Fundamental Things Apply as Alex Veselic
  Ryan Caulfield: Year One (one episode, 1999) - Sex and St. Michael as Lako
  V.I.P. (one episode, 2001) - A.I. Highrise as Vanderwall
  Son of the Beach (one episode, 2001) - From Russia, with Johnson as Sergei
  The Agency (one episode, 2001) - Deadline as Major
  Alias (two episodes, 2002) - The Box: Part 1 and The Box: Part 2 as Endo
  The District (one episode, 2004) - On Guard as Gregor Bukantz
  E-Ring (one episode, 2006) - War Crimes as Ivan
  Gilmore Girls (one episode, 2007) - I'm a Kayak, Hear Me Roar as Stefan
  The Unit (one episode, 2007) - Bedfellows as Customer One
  Raising the Bar (one episode, 2008) - Bagels and Locks as Andrei Markova
  Burn Notice (one episode, 2009) - Friends Like These as Milovan Dragas
  Gigantic (one episode, 2010) - Pilot: Part 2 as Gustav
  Nikita (one episode, 2010) - 2: 2.0 as Mirko Dadich
  Undercovers (one episode, 2010) - Crashed as Borz
  Scandal (one episode, 2012) - Sweet Baby as Polish Ambassador
  Intelligence (one episode, 2014) - The Grey Hat as Torbin Salvi
  House of Cards (one episode, 2015) - Chapter 32 as Boris Litsky
  Agents of S.H.I.E.L.D. (one episode, 2016) - Parting Shot as General Androvich
  Zoo (two episodes, 2016) - The Contingency & The Yellow Brick Road as Leonid Ivankov
  Scorpion (one episode, 2017) – Episode #4.2 as Manager Anton Eksteritsky
  Homecoming (two episodes, 2018) -Episode #1.2 and Episode 1.10 as Mr. Heidl
  I Am the Night (one episode, 2019) - "Episode #1.6" as Rachmaninoff
  FBI: Most Wanted (one episode, 2022) - A Man Without a Country as Aleksander Pavlishchev

References

External links 
 
 
  on https://www.spotlight.com/interactive/cv/1534-6725-8129]
 
 
 

Living people
1962 births
Polish male film actors